This was the first WTA edition of the tournament; the previous editions were ITF events. 

Amanda Augustus and Mélanie Marois were the defending champions, but did not compete together in 2004. Augustus paired up with Natalie Grandin and lost in the quarterfinals; whilst Marois played with Marie-Ève Pelletier and lost in the first round.

Americans Bethanie Mattek and Abigail Spears won the title, defeating Europeans Els Callens and Anna-Lena Grönefeld in the final in straight sets.

Seeds

Draw

Draw

Qualifying

Seeds
  Kelly Liggan /  Rosana de los Ríos (first round)
  Stéphanie Foretz /  Camille Pin (first round)

Qualifiers
  Sunitha Rao /  Kaysie Smashey

Draw

References

 Doubles Draw

Vancouver Open
2004 WTA Tour